Thanthani  is a village in the Aranthangirevenue block of Pudukkottai district, Tamil Nadu, India.

Demographics 

As per the 2001 census, Thanthani had a total population of 838 with 437 males and 401 females. Out of the total population 609 people were literate.

References

Villages in Pudukkottai district